Out of the Moon is the second album by New Zealand band Goldenhorse, released in 2005 under Siren Records. The album peaked at No. 2 on the RIANZ music chart.

Track listing
 "Don't Wake Me Up"
 "Used to Think"
 "Out of the Moon"
 "Cool Pants"
 "Run Run Run"
 "Cowgirl Lament" 
 "Fish"
 "Alien"
 "Four Minute Drive" 
 "Trinkity Trunk"
 "Waltz"
 "Cold Mountainside"
 "Emptied Out"

Charts

References 

Goldenhorse albums
2005 albums